Caseolus sphaerula is a species of small land snail, a terrestrial pulmonate gastropod mollusk.

The specific epithet is spelled sphaerulus in both of the references here cited, however the species is also often referred to as C. sphaerula, for example in the Convention of Berne and the Habitats Directive. The species was named as Helix (Caseolus) sphaerula. In Latin,"sphaerula" is a noun meaning "little sphere", so it does not change ending.

Distribution and conservation status
This species of land snail lives in Madeira on dry, stony ground.

It is mentioned in annexes II and IV of the Habitats Directive. This species is threatened by forest replanting, mixed forms of pollution, erosion and the impact of improved access to its habitat. Its future prospects are bad and the species is likely to become extinct in its biogeographical region.

References

Further reading 
Bank R.A., Groh K. & Ripken T. E. J. 2002 Catalogue and bibliography of the non-marine Mollusca of Macaronesia In Falkner, M., Groh, K. & Speight, M. C. D. (eds) Collectanea Malacologica, Festschrift für Gerhard Falkner Conchbooks, Hackenheim, pp. 89–235.
Cook, L. M., Goodfriend, G. A. & Cameron, R. A. D. 1993. Changes in the land snail fauna of eastern Madeira during the Quaternary. Phil. Trans. R. Soc. Lond. B, 339, 83-103
Cameron, R. A. D. & Cook, L. M. (1996). Diversity and durability: responses of the Madeiran and Porto-Santan snail faunas to natural and human-induced environmental change. American Malacological Bulletin, Vol. 12(1/2), 3-12.
Paiva, C. 1867. Monographia Molluscorum Terrestrium Fluvialium, Lacustrium Isularium Maderensium, Mem. Acad. R. Sci. Lisboa, Cl. Sci. Math. Phys. Nat., N. S. 4 (1): 46.

sphaerulus
Gastropods described in 1852